Ochthia is an Aromanian (Vlach) village and a community of the Agrinio municipality. Since the 2011 local government reform it was part of the municipality Stratos, of which it was a municipal district. The 2011 census recorded 506 residents in the village. The community of Ochthia covers an area of 12.4 km2.

See also
 List of settlements in Aetolia-Acarnania

References

Populated places in Aetolia-Acarnania
Aromanian settlements in Greece